The 2022 Purdue Fort Wayne Mastodons men's volleyball team represents Purdue University Fort Wayne in the 2022 NCAA Division I & II men's volleyball season. The Mastodons, led by seventh year head coach Ryan Perrotte, play their home games at Hilliard Gates Sports Center. The Mastodons are members of the Midwestern Intercollegiate Volleyball Association and were picked to finish sixth in the MIVA in the preseason poll.

Roster

Schedule

 *-Indicates conference match.
 Times listed are Eastern Time Zone.

Broadcasters
King: Brittney Ramsey & Julie Ward
Lincoln Memorial: Adam Haley
Maryville: Mike Maahs
George Mason: Mike Maahs
St. Francis Brooklyn: Marc Ernay
NJIT: Ira Thor
St. Francis: Mike Maahs
St. Francis: Mike Maahs & Steve Florio
Sacred Heart: Brendan Picozzi
Harvard: Dylan Hornblum
Lindenwood: Mike Maahs
Quincy: Mike Maahs
Ball State: Baylen Hite & Kevin Owens
Ohio State: Tyler Danburg & Hanna Williford
Lewis: Cody Lindeman, Farah Taki, & Megan Schlechte
McKendree: Mike Maahs & Victoria Brisack
Loyola Chicago: Scott Sudikoff & Ray Gooden
Charleston (WV): No commentary
Central State: Doug Brown
Daemen: Mike Maahs & Victoria Brisack
Loyola Chicago: Mike Maahs 
Lewis: Mike Maahs
McKendree: Colin Suhre
Quincy: No commentary
Lindenwood: Michael Wagenknecht & Sara Wagenknecht
Ohio State: Mike Maahs & Steve Florio
Ball State: Mike Maahs
McKendree: Colin Suhre
Loyola Chicago: Scott Sudikoff & Ray Gooden
Ball State: Joel Godett, Amber Seaman, & Madison Surface

Honors
To be filled in upon completion of the season.

References

2022 in sports in Indiana
2022 NCAA Division I & II men's volleyball season
2022 team
Purdue Fort Wayne